The Italian Baker Sdn Bhd (doing business as Massimo) is a Malaysian bakery chain based in Selangor owned by The Italian Baker Sdn Bhd, a subsidiary of Federal Flour Mills Berhad. Its bread is packed in 3 colours (green, white and red) based on the Italian flag, and baked with the combination of traditional techniques and modern machinery.

Distribution 
The Massimo company has invested MYR120 million into a fully automated bakery plant in Indah Island, Selangor which produces 16,000 loaves of bread and 24,000 buns daily and transport to West Malaysia.

See also 

 List of bakeries

References

External links 
 

2011 establishments in Malaysia
Bakeries of Malaysia
Privately held companies of Malaysia
Malaysian brands
Retail companies established in 2011
Food and drink companies established in 2011
Malaysian companies established in 2011